White Cap Marine Towing and Salvage is a small marine salvage firm based in New York City.
The firm operates out of Sheepshead Bay, Brooklyn, a small inlet that connects to the much larger Jamaica Bay.
The firm is owned by Jack and Bernie Schachner, and specializes in rescuing or salvaging the smaller recreational vessels and smaller fishing vessels that operate out of the smaller inlets around Jamaica Bay.  White Cap is also a franchisee of Sea Tow, the leading marine assistance services company.
The National Park Service employs the firm to remove abandoned craft from the ecologically protected Gerritsen Creek, part of the  Gateway National Recreation Area.

In 2009 the New York Daily News reported on White Cap's assistance in the salvage of a large, historic brass bell.
The 500 pound bell had once been at the top of a  tower at Coney Island, and had been lost when the tower collapsed during a storm, 95 years earlier.
   
The typical salvage fees for bringing smaller abandoned recreational craft to where they can be disposed of safely started at $1500.
According to NBC News and the Brooklyn Daily, many boaters simply abandoned their recreational boats in 2008, without realizing they could still be identified as the boats' owners and could still be fined to pay for the boats' disposal.
According to a profile of the firm in the New York Times, larger salvage operations can earn the firm tens of thousands of dollars.
Bernie Schachner described rescuing the crew of a small fishing vessel who offered them "20,000 clams"—with "clams" referring to actual mollusks, not cash.

References

Sheepshead Bay, Brooklyn
Marine salvors
Companies based in Brooklyn